Bahau is a state constituency in Negeri Sembilan, Malaysia, that has been represented in the Negeri Sembilan State Legislative Assembly.

The state constituency was first contested in 1959 and is mandated to return a single Assemblyman to the Negeri Sembilan State Legislative Assembly under the first-past-the-post voting system. , the State Assemblyman for Bahau is Teo Kok Seong from the Democratic Action Party (DAP), which is part of the state's ruling coalition, Pakatan Harapan (PH).

Definition 
The Bahau constituency contains the polling districts of Kampong Bukit Perah, Kampong Batu Kikir, Kampong Lonek, Kuala Jempol, Kampung Kuala Kepis, Kampung Jambu Lapan, Taman ACBE, Pekan Bahau, Kampong Indah and Kampong Bakar Batu.

Representation history

Election results
The electoral results for the Bahau state constituency in 2008, 2013 and 2018 are as follows.

References

Negeri Sembilan state constituencies